

Events
 Carthage is founded by Phoenician colonists from modern-day Lebanon, led by queen Dido. The city developed into a maritime power that dominated the Mediterranean Sea.

Deaths

References

9th century BC